Ispiritista: Itay, May Moomoo!  is a 2005 Filipino comedy/fantasy/horror film directed by Tony Y. Reyes, based on a story concept by Reyes, Antonio P. Tuviera, and Nino Tuviera-Rodriguez, with a screenplay by Reyes and R.J. Nuevas, and starring Vic Sotto, Cindy Kurleto, Iza Calzado and BJ Forbes.

Synopsis
Victor (Vic Sotto) started drinking when his wife Linda (Iza Calzado) suddenly died although he keeps it from his son Tom Tom (BJ Forbes).

One day, Victor thinks of a way by which he can make others who are also mourning feel better—and make money in the process. With the help of two cohorts, Wally (Wally Bayola) and George (Jose Manalo), Victor passes himself off as an Ispiritist who can communicate with restless spirits for a price. His son has no idea that his dad is a fake medium and in fact, idolizes his father. He proudly tells his classmates that his father gets rids of ghosts for a living.

Victor is hired by Tom Tom’s school to speak to the ghost of a little girl and ask her to leave the campus. As his dad prepares, a surprised Tom Tom discovers that he can see and talk to Didith (Abigail Arazo), the little girl's ghost. She tells Tom Tom what needs to be done to calm her restless soul. Tom Tom obeys her instructions, and she stops haunting the school. Victor takes the credit and accepts the school’s thanks for a job well done.

After this success, Victor quickly finds more ghost-busting work. Impressed by how he handled the lady, Lalaine (Cindy Kurleto) hires Victor to rid her boarding house of a quartet of spirits (Teri Onor, Allan K., Soxy Topacio, Antonio Aquitania) who are scaring her boarders. Victor promptly accepts, believing Lalaine might be a possible wife for him and a mother for his son. However, Lalaine discovered his con not only losing a love interest but also the respect of his son. Just when Victor is about to apologize for his sins, he realizes that he has suddenly developed the power to see and speak to ghosts. Victor realizes what he must make up for his lies. During the film's climax, Victor, Tom Tom, Lalaine, Wally, George, and an absent-minded priest Fr. Ben (Jonee Gamboa) must enter a haunted mansion and get rid of the spirits that inhabit it.

Cast

 Vic Sotto as Victor Espiritu
 Cindy Kurleto as Lalaine Morales
 Iza Calzado as Linda
 BJ Forbes as Tomtom Espiritu
 Jose Manalo as George
 Wally Bayola as Wally
 Robert Arevalo as Señor Segundo
 Keempee de Leon as Ghost

 Allan K. as  Allan
 Gladys Guevarra as Salve
 Marissa Delgado as Mrs. Bernabe
 Dick Israel as Brother Jojo
 Redford White as Mang Teroy
 Sugar Mercado as Border
 Joonee Gamboa as Father Ben
 Teri Onor as Teri

 Antonio Aquitania as Bert
 Soxy Topacio as Soxy
 Jacky Woo as Mr. Kho
 Mae Akizuki as Mrs. Kho
 Rudy Meyer as Mr. Bernabe
 Jean Saburit as Corazon
 Angel Sy as Cookie

Recognition
The film earned 10 million pesos on its first day, a new record for Regal Films and APT Entertainment.

Awards and nominations
The film received a 2006 FAP Awards nomination.

References

External links
 

2005 films
Philippine comedy horror films
2000s comedy horror films
Philippine ghost films
Philippine fantasy films
2000s ghost films
Philippine haunted house films
2005 horror films
Regal Entertainment films
APT Entertainment films
M-Zet Productions films
2005 comedy films
Films directed by Tony Y. Reyes